Abdulla Al Futtaim (Arabic: عبدالله الفطيم) is an Emirati billionaire businessman, owner of  Al-Futtaim Group, and cousin of fellow billionaire Majid Al Futtaim.

He earned his wealth through operations in the automotive field, as well as retail and real estate. 

As of October 2021, his net worth was estimated at $2.2 billion.

Personal life
He is married and lives in Dubai. His son, Omar Al Futtaim, is the CEO of Al-Futtaim Private Company LLC.

He is owner of the megayacht Radiant. The ship, originally commissioned by Boris Berezovsky, is 360 feet, and as of 2013, it ranked as the seventh most expensive luxury asset acquisition of all time, according to a study by Wealth-X.

References

Living people
Emirati businesspeople
Emirati billionaires
Year of birth missing (living people)